New Vico Studies was a peer-reviewed academic journal that examined current scholarship on the Italian philosopher Giambattista Vico.  It was published annually in print and electronic formats by the Philosophy Documentation Center, in cooperation with the Institute for Vico Studies at Emory University.  Established in 1983, it ceased publication of new issues in 2010 with the completion of Volume 27 (2009).

Indexing
New Vico Studies is abstracted and indexed in Academic Search Premier, Current Abstracts, Expanded Academic ASAP, Index, Index Philosophicus, Index to Social Sciences & Humanities Proceedings, InfoTrac OneFile, International Bibliography of Periodical Literature (IBZ), International Bibliography of Book Reviews of Scholarly Literature (IBR), MLA International Bibliography, Periodical Index Online, Philosopher's Index, Philosophy Research Index, Reference and Research Book News, Russian Academy of Sciences Bibliographies, and TOC Premier.

See also 
 List of philosophy journals

External links 
 
 Institute for Vico Studies
 Philosophy Documentation Center

Annual journals
English-language journals
Vico, Giambattista
Publications established in 1983
Philosophy Documentation Center academic journals
Publications disestablished in 2010
Giambattista Vico